WBMS (Web Business Management System) is a web-based software that manages or runs a website with specific business functions or requirements. These web-based tools allows business owners to run their website with a business mindset. 

Features of a WBMS can contain:
 Content Management System or Content Control  the ability to change content in a website
 Blog  ability to post blogs and syndicate via RSS feeds
 E-commerce  to accept secure payment for products and/or services
 CRM  (Customer Relationship Management) manage customer data captured from all aspects of communication within the website

Website management